The 2016–17 Austrian Football Bundesliga  was the 105th season of top-tier football in Austria. Red Bull Salzburg are the defending champions. The fixtures were announced on 14 June 2016. The season began on 23 July 2016 and ended on 28 May 2017.

Teams 
St. Pölten, the 2015–16 First League champion, returned to the top level 22 years after their relegation.

Stadia and locations

Personnel and kits

League table

Results

First half of season

Second half of season

Season statistics

Top goalscorers

Top assists

Attendances

Awards

Annual awards

Player of the Year 

The Player of the Year awarded to  Andreas Ulmer 
(Red Bull Salzburg)

Top goalscorer  

The Top goalscorer of the Year awarded to  Olarenwaju Kayode (Austria Wien)

Manager of the Year 

The Manager of the Year awarded to  Oscar Garcia 
(Red Bull Salzburg)

Breakthrough of the Year  
The Breakthrough of the Year awarded to  Konrad Laimer 
(Red Bull Salzburg)

Team of the Year

Goalkeeper:  Alexander Walke (Red Bull Salzburg)
Defence:  Stefan Lainer (Red Bull Salzburg),
 Paulo Miranda (Red Bull Salzburg),  Philipp Netzer (Rheindorf Altach),  Charalampos Lykogiannis (Sturm Graz)
Midfield:  Lucas Venuto (Austria Wien),  Konrad Laimer (Red Bull Salzburg) ,  Alexander Grünwald (Austria Wien),  Valon Berisha (Red Bull Salzburg)
Attack:  Deni Alar (Sturm Graz),   Olarenwaju Kayode (Austria Wien)

References

External links
  

Austrian Football Bundesliga seasons
Aus
1